|}

The Blue Wind Stakes is a Group 3 flat horse race in Ireland open to thoroughbred fillies and mares aged three years or older. It is run over a distance of 1 mile and 2 furlongs (2,012 metres) at Naas in May.

History
The event is named after Blue Wind, the Irish-trained winner of the Epsom Oaks and Irish Oaks in 1981. It was established in 2001, and was initially staged at Cork.

The race originally held Listed status, and was promoted to Group 3 level in 2004. It was transferred to Naas in 2005.

The Blue Wind Stakes can sometimes serve as a trial for the Epsom Oaks. The last participant to win the Oaks was Was, the third-placed horse in 2012.

Records
Most successful horse:
 no horse has won this race more than once

Leading jockey (6 wins):
 Kevin Manning – Villa Carlotta (2002), Galatee (2006), Akdarena (2010), Banimpire (2011), Pleascach (2015), Turret Rocks (2017)

Leading trainer (6 wins):

 Jim Bolger – Villa Carlotta (2002), Galatee (2006), Akdarena (2010), Banimpire (2011), Pleascach (2015), Turret Rocks (2017)

Winners

See also
 Horse racing in Ireland
 List of Irish flat horse races

References

 Racing Post:
 , 

 galopp-sieger.de – Blue Wind Stakes.
 ifhaonline.org – International Federation of Horseracing Authorities – Blue Wind Stakes (2019).
 pedigreequery.com – Blue Wind Stakes – Naas.

Middle distance horse races for fillies and mares
Sport in County Kildare
Flat races in Ireland
2001 establishments in Ireland
Recurring sporting events established in 2001
Naas Racecourse